The Maestà, or Maestà of Duccio is an altarpiece composed of many individual paintings commissioned by the city of Siena in 1308 from the artist Duccio di Buoninsegna and is his most famous work. The front panels make up a large enthroned Madonna and Child with saints and angels, and a predella of the Childhood of Christ with prophets.  The reverse has the rest of a combined cycle of the Life of the Virgin and the Life of Christ in a total of forty-three small scenes; several panels are now dispersed or lost. The base of the panel has an inscription that reads (in translation): "Holy Mother of God, be thou the cause of peace for Siena and life to Duccio because he painted thee thus." Though it took a generation for its effect to be truly felt, Duccio's Maestà set Italian painting on a course leading away from the hieratic representations of Byzantine art towards more direct presentations of reality.

History

Duccio di Buoninsegna painted the work with assistants in a studio located on Via Stalloreggi, very close to the Siena Cathedral. The painting was installed in the cathedral on 9 June 1311 after a procession of the work in a loop around the city. One person who witnessed this event wrote:

And on that day when it was brought into the cathedral, all workshops remained closed, and the bishop commanded a great host of devoted priests and monks to file past in solemn procession. This was accompanied by all the high officers of the Commune and by all the people; all honorable citizens of Siena surrounded said panel with candles held in their hands, and women and children followed humbly behind. They accompanied the panel amidst the glorious pealing of bells after a solemn procession on the Piazza del Campo into the very cathedral; and all this out of reverence for the costly panel… The poor received many alms, and we prayed to the Holy Mother of God, our patron saint, that she might in her infinite mercy preserve this our city of Siena from every misfortune, traitor or enemy.

Besides the Virgin Mary and the Baby Jesus, saints depicted in the painting include John the Evangelist (to the left of the throne); Saint Paul; Catherine of Alexandria; John the Baptist (to the right of the throne); Saint Peter; Mary Magdalene, and Saint Agnes. In the foreground are Siena's various patron saints: Saint Ansanus; Saint Sabinus; Saint Crescentius; and Saint Victor.

Creating this altarpiece assembled from many wood panels bonded together before painting was an arduous undertaking. The work was not only large, the central panel was 7 by 13 feet, but it had to be painted on both sides since it could be seen from all directions when installed on the main altar at the centre of the sanctuary.

Dismantling and current locations
The altarpiece remained in place until 1771, when it was dismantled in order to distribute the pieces between two altars. The  construction was dismantled and sawn up, and the paintings damaged in the process. Partial restoration took place in 1956. The dismantling also led to pieces going astray, either being sold or simply unaccounted for. Extant remains of the altarpiece not at Siena are divided among several other museums in Europe and the United States.

The panels in Siena are housed in the Duomo museum adjacent to the Duomo di Siena. The central panel, lower panels, and rear are displayed separately in the same room.

Stylistic analysis
 Deposition
Christ's followers, Joseph and John, remove him from the cross while Nicodemus removes nails from his feet. The Virgin Mary looks into his closed eyes while Mary Magdalene holds his arm, and all have painful expressions as they tend to the dead Christ. The background has the same gold texture as in the "Crucifixion" and the cross that held Christ has blood running onto the ground, increasing the sense of realism in the scene. This panel aroused the emotions of its audiences and the story helped to symbolize the birth of Christianity.
 Burial
Immediately following the "Deposition" is the depiction of Christ as he is prepared for burial, surrounded by his mourning followers. His mother leans in close to him and kisses him one last time and Mary Magdalene throws her arms towards the sky in anguish. The background retains the gold setting of the "Deposition" and "Crucifixion," and the mountains in the background are similar to the mountains portrayed in previous and subsequent panels. These mountains lead the viewer's eye to Mary, who is accompanying him, and then to Christ's face. This scene also elicits an intense emotional response from its viewers and you can see the close connection that the burial party has to Christ, and especially to the Virgin Mary.

List of panels in the world

In Siena

 The Mother of God Enthroned with the Christ Child Amidst Angels and Saints, central panel
 The Wedding Feast of Cana
 The Temptation of Christ atop the Temple
 The Annunciation of the Virgin's death
 The Virgin's Farewell to St. John
 The Virgin's Farewell to the Apostles
 The Death of the Virgin
 The Funeral of the Virgin
 The Burial of the Virgin
 The Appearance of Christ behind closed doors
 The Incredulity of St. Thomas
 The Pentecost
 The Appearance of Christ on Lake Tiberias
 The Appearance of Christ on the Mountain in Galilee
 The Appearance of Christ to the Apostles at Supper 
 The Adoration of the Magi; Solomon
 The Presentation in the Temple; the prophet Malachi
 The Massacre of the Innocents; the prophet Jeremiah
 The Flight into Egypt; the prophet Hosea
 The Boy Jesus among the Doctors
 Episodes from Christ's Passion Tempera and gold on wood. The work, consisting of 26 episodes on 14 panels, was originally the reverse surface of the Maestà.

Elsewhere

Europe
 Angel (formerly in the Stoclet Collection, Brussels)
 The Annunciation (National Gallery, London)
 Archangel Gabriel (Castel Huis Bergh, in 's-Heerenberg, The Netherlands)
 Christ and the Samaritan Woman (Museo Thyssen-Bornemisza, Madrid)
 The Coronation of the Virgin (Szépmüveszéti Muzeum, Budapest – image)
 Healing of the Blind Man (National Gallery, London)
 The Transfiguration (National Gallery, London)

United States
 Angel (Philadelphia Museum of Art, Philadelphia)
 Angel (Mount Holyoke College, South Hadley, Massachusetts)
 Isaiah; Nativity; Ezekiel (Andrew W. Mellon Collection, National Gallery of Art, Washington, DC)
 Temptation of Christ on the Mountain (Frick Collection, New York)
 Calling of SS. Peter and Andrew (Samuel H. Kress Collection, National Gallery of Art, Washington DC)
 The raising of Lazarus (Kimbell Art Museum, Fort Worth, Texas)

See also
 Life of Jesus in the New Testament

References

Further reading

External links

 Article giving diagrams of the structure and images of the pieces
Carl Brandon Strehlke, "Archangel by the Workshop of Duccio di Buoninsegna (cat. 88)," in The John G. Johnson Catalogue: A History and Selected Works, a Philadelphia Museum of Art free digital publication.

Paintings by Duccio
1300s paintings
Paintings of the Resurrection of Lazarus
Paintings of the Madonna and Child
Christian art
Christian iconography
Paintings depicting John the Baptist
Paintings depicting Paul the Apostle
Paintings depicting Saint Peter
Angels in art
Paintings on gold backgrounds
Polyptychs
Paintings depicting Thomas the Apostle
Paintings depicting Mary Magdalene